The 2003–04 National Football League was the eighth season of National Football League, the top Indian league for association football clubs, since its inception in 1996.

Overview
The fixtures for the first phase of the season (till round 11) were announced on 20 November 2003. It was contested by 12 teams, and East Bengal won the championship, in the month of April under the coach Subhas Bhowmick. Dempo came second and Mahindra came third. Indian Bank and Mohammedan were relegated from the National Football League next season.

League standings

Season statistics

Top scorers

Hat-tricks

Note: (H) – Home; (A) – Away

References

External links 
 Season home at Rediff.com
 8th National Football League at Rec.Sport.Soccer Statistics Foundation

National Football League (India) seasons
1
India